2-Nitronaphthalene is an organic compound with the formula .  It is one of two isomers of nitronaphthalene, the other being 1-nitronaphthalene.  2-Nitronaphthalene is produced in very low yields upon nitration of naphthalene, but it can be more efficiently obtained via the diazotization of 2-aminonaphthalene.

References

Nitronaphthalenes
2-Naphthyl compounds